Eine may refer to:

 EINE, a text editor
 Eine (river), in Germany
 Eine, Belgium, a village
 Ben Eine (born 1970), British street artist